Veronica della Dora  (born 1976) is an Italian cultural geographer. She is Professor of Human Geography at Royal Holloway, University of London, where she is Director of the Social, Cultural & Historical Geography Group and Co-Director of the Centre for GeoHumanities (with Harriet Hawkins).

Della Dora comes from Venice and grew up living on the Lido. She gained a PhD from University of California, Los Angeles (UCLA) in 2005, under the supervision of Denis Cosgrove. After leaving UCLA, she joined the Getty Research Institute, Los Angeles as a post-doctoral fellow, before moving to the University of Bristol in 2007 as a lecturer. She joined Royal Holloway, University of London as Professor in September 2013.

Her first monograph Imagining Mount Athos: Visions of a Holy Mountain from Homer to World War II was shortlisted for the Criticos Prize in 2012. Landscape, Nature and the Sacred in Byzantium was nominated for the 2017 Runciman Award. In 2018, della Dora was elected a Fellow of the British Academy.

Selected publications
High Places: Cultural Geographies of Mountains and Ice (2008, Cosgrove, D and della Dora, V.;)
Visual and Historical Geographies: Essays in Honour of Denis E. Cosgrove (2010, edited by della Dora, V; Digby, S; Basdas, B.; Royal Geographical Society - Institute of British Geographers,)
Imagining Mount Athos: Visions of a Holy Place from Homer to World War II (2011, University of Virginia Press)
Christian Pilgrimage, Landscape, and Heritage: Journeying to the Sacred (2014,  Maddrell, Avril ; della Dora, Veronica; Scafi, Alessandro; Walton, Heather;)
Mountain: Nature and Culture (2016,)
Landscape, Nature, and the Sacred in Byzantium (2016,)
The Mantle of the Earth: Genealogies of a Geographical Metaphor (2021, University of Chicago Press)

References

External links

1976 births
Living people
Fellows of the British Academy
Academics of Royal Holloway, University of London
Academics of the University of Bristol
University of California, Los Angeles alumni
Women geographers
Italian geographers
Human geographers
Cultural geographers
Historical geographers
21st-century geographers
Italian women academics
21st-century Italian women
21st-century Italian people
Historians of Byzantine art
Women Byzantinists